Naser Khosrow (also Romanized as Nāşer Khosrow) is a village in Abezhdan Rural District, Abezhdan District, Andika County, Khuzestan Province, Iran. At the 2006 census, its population was 656, in 135 families.

References 

Populated places in Andika County